St. John the Baptist parish may refer to one of a number of religious organisations:

In the district of Clontarf, Dublin, Ireland:

 The Church of Ireland Parish of Clontarf
 The senior Parish of Clontarf (Roman Catholic)
 The first known Anglican parish in Brazil, settled in Nova Lima, State of Minas Gerais in 1834.

It may also refer to St. John the Baptist Parish, Louisiana, a municipal subdivision in the state of Louisiana.